The Ranellidae, common name the triton shells or tritons, are a taxonomic family of small to very large predatory sea snails, marine gastropod mollusks in the order Littorinimorpha.

Subfamilies
According to the taxonomy of the Gastropoda by Bouchet & Rocroi, 2005, the family Ranellidae consisted of two subfamilies:
Ranellinae Gray, 1854 - synonyms: Agrobuccininae Kilias, 1973; Simpulidae Dautzenberg, 1900; Gyrineinae Higo & Goto, 1993 (n.a.)
Cymatiinae Iredale, 1913 (1854) - synonyms: Tritoniidae H. Adams & A. Adams, 1853 (inv.); Neptunellinae Gray, 1854; Lampusiidae Newton, 1891; Lotoriidae Harris, 1897; Septidae Dall & Simpson, 1901; Aquillidae Pilsbry, 1904; Nyctilochidae Dall, 1912; Charoniinae Powell, 1933

The Cymatiinae now form a separate family: Cymatiidae.

Genera
The family Ranellidae contains the following genera:

 Haurokoa C. A. Fleming, 1955 †
 Obscuranella Kantor & Harasewych, 2000
 Priene H. Adams & A. Adams, 1858
 Ranella Lamarck, 1816

References

 Bouchet P. & Rocroi J.-P. (2005). Classification and nomenclator of gastropod families. Malacologia. 47(1-2): 1-397

Further reading
 Powell A W B, New Zealand Mollusca, William Collins Publishers Ltd, Auckland, New Zealand 1979 
 Glen Pownall, New Zealand Shells and Shellfish, Seven Seas Publishing Pty Ltd, Wellington, New Zealand 1979

External links
  Beu A.G. (1998). Résultats des Campagnes MUSORSTOM: 19. Indo-West Pacific Ranellidae, Bursidae and Personidae (Mollusca: Gastropoda), a monograph of the New Caledonian fauna and revisions of related taxa. Mémoires du Muséum national d'Histoire naturelle. 178: 1-255

 
Taxa named by John Edward Gray